Kuršas is Lithuanian name for:

Courland -  historical  region of Latvia and Lithuania . 
Kuršas a building in Klaipėda, Lithuania.